Rolleston station is around half a mile from the small village of Rolleston, one of the Trent side villages close to Southwell in Nottinghamshire, England. The station is convenient for Southwell Racecourse, to which it is adjacent.

History
The station was opened on 4 August 1846 with services running between Nottingham and Lincoln.

The branch line to Southwell was opened in 1847 but the Midland Railway suspended passenger services to Southwell for a while during the 1850s. These were restored from 1 August 1860 as the Midland Railway saw demand for a planned new line through Southwell to Mansfield.

On Saturday 5 December 1874, John Bradwell, senior church warden at Southwell Minster, stopped on the foot crossing and being very deaf did not hear an approaching train which knocked him down. The station master arranged for him to be taken by train to Newark but as the local surgeon arrived at Newark station, the victim had died from his injuries. The recommendation from the inquest was that a footbridge be installed. 

The station was previously known as Rolleston Junction, as it used to be the junction for the railway line to Southwell and Mansfield, which in its latter years played host to the locally loved 'Southwell Paddy' service. This line closed to passengers in June 1959, although the service beyond Southwell ended three decades earlier. The name also avoided confusion with Rolleston-on-Dove railway station on the line between Burton upon Trent and Egginton Junction.

Stationmasters
Edward Holmes until 1862
J. Hey 1862 - 1864
J.W. Jones 1864
William Smedley ca. 1864
Thomas Norris Found 1871 - 1899
Thomas England 1899 - ca. 1914 
William George Dudderidge 1918 - 1936 (formerly station master at Yeadon, Yorkshire, from 1925 also station master at Fiskerton, from 1932 also station master at Bleasby)
Arnold Foster 1936 - 1942
H.J. Lane until 1947
F.W.E. Clarke from 1947 (formerly stationmaster at Widmerpool)
W.J. Smith ca. 1954

Facilities
Rolleston is on the Nottingham to Lincoln Line, its neighbouring stations being Newark Castle, around 4 miles east, and Fiskerton, around ¾ mile west. The station is owned by Network Rail and managed by East Midlands Railway, who provide services to the station.

The station is unstaffed and offers limited facilities other than two shelters, bicycle storage, timetables and modern help points. The full range of tickets can be purchased from the guard on the train at no extra cost as there are no retail facilities at this station.

Services
All services at Rolleston are operated by East Midlands Railway.

The typical off-peak service is:
 1 train every 2 hours to  via 
 1 train every 2 hours to 

There is also a two-hourly service on Sundays although trains run between Nottingham, Lincoln and Grimsby with no service to Crewe.

References

External links

Railway stations in Nottinghamshire
DfT Category F2 stations
Former Midland Railway stations
Newark and Sherwood
Railway stations in Great Britain opened in 1846
Railway stations served by East Midlands Railway
1846 establishments in England